Giles County High School is a public high school in Pulaski, Tennessee.

State scores are slightly below average. English 1-4 is offered with Honors. Foreign languages include Spanish and French. A journalism and video journalism class completes the language Department. Giles County High's math options include Pre-Algebra, Algebra 1 and 2, Geometry, Pre-Calculus, Calculus, and College Algebra. The Science Department features Biology 1 and 2, Chemistry 1 and 2, Physics, Ecology, Anatomy, Physical and Life Sciences. The Social Studies department offers World History, World Geography, American Government, United States History, Economics, International Business, Marketing, and Physiology. The Arts include Art 1-4, Theater, Chorus, and The GCHS Band of Gold.

References

External links
 Giles County High School website

Public high schools in Tennessee
Schools in Giles County, Tennessee